The president of the American Statistical Association is the head of the American Statistical Association (ASA). According to the association's bylaws, the president is an officer, and a member of the board of directors and of the executive committee. Elections for the position are held annually, in which all full members are eligible to vote. The term in office is typically three years, as president-elect and past president are also official positions.

List of presidents

19th century

20th century

21st century

References

External links 
Bylaws and constitution
ASA Presidential Papers

 
American Statistical Association
American Statistical Association
Statistics-related lists